Álvaro Díaz Pérez (1950 – 13 December 2021) was a Chilean economist and politician.

References

1950 births
2021 deaths
20th-century Chilean economists
Chilean diplomats
Socialist Party of Chile politicians
Ambassadors of Chile to Brazil
21st-century Chilean economists